The Church of Jesus Christ of Latter-day Saints (LDS Church) has been subject to criticism and sometimes discrimination since its early years in New York and Pennsylvania. In the late 1820s, criticism centered around the claim by Joseph Smith to have been led to a set of golden plates from which the Book of Mormon was reputedly translated.

In the 1830s, one of several criticisms was for Smith's handling of a banking failure in Kirtland, Ohio. After the Mormons migrated west, there was fear and suspicion about the LDS Church's political and military power in Missouri, culminating in the 1838 Mormon War and the infamous Mormon Extermination Order by Governor Lilburn Boggs. In the 1840s, criticism of the church centered on its theocratic aspirations in Nauvoo, Illinois. Criticism of the practice of plural marriage and other doctrines taught by Smith were published in the Nauvoo Expositor. Opposition led to a series of events culminating in the death of Smith and his brother while jailed in 1844.

As the church began openly practicing plural marriage under Brigham Young during the second half of the 19th century, the church became the target of nationwide criticism for that practice, as well as for the church's theocratic aspirations in Utah Territory.  Young introduced policies in 1852 that discriminated against black men and women of African descent which were not reversed until 1978. Beginning in 1857, the church also came under significant media criticism after the Mountain Meadows Massacre in southern Utah.

Academic critics have questioned the legitimacy of Smith as a prophet as well as the historical authenticity of the Book of Mormon and the Book of Abraham. Criticism has expanded to include claims of historical revisionism, homophobia, racism, and sexist policies. Notable 20th-century critics include Jerald and Sandra Tanner and historian Fawn Brodie. Evangelical Christians continue to argue that Smith was either fraudulent or delusional.

Mormon apologetics organizations, such as the Foundation for Apologetic Information & Research (FAIR) and the Foundation for Ancient Research and Mormon Studies (FARMS), have been founded to counter these criticisms. Most of the apologetic work focuses on providing and discussing evidence supporting the claims of Smith and the Book of Mormon. Scholars and authors such as Hugh Nibley, Daniel C. Peterson, Orson Scott Card, and James E. Talmage are well-known apologists within the church.

Critics 

The LDS Church and Mormonism have attracted criticism from their inception to the present day. Notable early critics of Mormonism included Lucy Harris, Abner Cole, Eber D. Howe, and Thomas C. Sharp. Notable modern critics of the LDS Church include Jerald and Sandra Tanner, Richard Abanes, Richard and Joan Ostling, historian Fawn M. Brodie, Jeremy Runnells and John Dehlin. In recent years, the Internet has provided a new forum for critics.

The church's 2008 support of California's Proposition 8 sparked heated debate and protests by gay-rights organizations. Affirmation is a group of current and former members of the LDS Church who have criticized the church's policies on homosexuality. Christian Apologetics and Research Ministry is a Christian organization that has criticized the church's theology. The Institute for Religious Research is an organization that has criticized the church, in particular the Book of Abraham. Numerous other organizations maintain web sites that criticize the church.

Joseph Smith and the early church (1820–1844)

Polygamy 

Polygamy is perhaps the most controversial early LDS practice, and was a key contributing factor for Smith's murder. Under heavy pressure — Utah would not be accepted as a state if polygamy was practiced — the church formally and publicly renounced the practice in 1890. Utah's statehood soon followed. However, plural marriage remains a divisive issue, as despite the official renunciation of 1890, it still has sympathizers, defenders, and semi-secret practitioners.

Sarah Pratt, first wife of Apostle Orson Pratt, in an outspoken critique of Mormon polygamy, said that polygamy:

completely demoralizes good men and makes bad men correspondingly worse. As for the women—well, God help them! First wives it renders desperate, or else heart-broken, mean-spirited creatures.
Pratt ended her marriage to husband Orson Pratt in 1868 because of his "obsession with marrying younger women" (at age 57, Orson Pratt married a sixteen-year-old girl, his tenth wife, younger than his daughter Celestia). Sarah Pratt lashed out at Orson in an 1877 interview, stating:

Here was my husband, gray headed, taking to his bed young girls in mockery of marriage. Of course there could be no joy for him in such an intercourse except for the indulgence of his fanaticism and of something else, perhaps, which I hesitate to mention.

The Tanners argue that early church leaders established the practice of polygamy in order to justify behavior that would otherwise be regarded as immoral. The Ostlings criticize Joseph Smith for marrying at least 32 women during his lifetime, including several under the age of 16, a fact acknowledged by Mormon historian Todd Compton. Compton also acknowledges that Smith entered into polyandrous marriages (that is, he married women who were already married to other men) and that he warned some potential spouses of eternal damnation if they did not consent to be his wife; in at least two cases, Smith married orphan girls who had come to live at his home.

However, Bushman notes that evidence of sexual relations between Smith and any wives of his followers is sparse or unreliable. Compton argues that some marriages were likely dynastic in nature, to link families.

Historical authenticity of the Book of Mormon 

Discussion regarding the historicity of the Book of Mormon often focuses on archaeological issues, some of which relate to the large size and the long time span of the civilizations mentioned in the book. After Joseph Smith founded the movement in upstate New York in the 1820s, the faith drew its first converts while Smith was dictating the text of the Book of Mormon from golden plates with reformed Egyptian writing on them, which he said he found buried after being directed to their location by the Angel Moroni. The book described itself as a chronicle of early indigenous peoples of the Americas, known as the Nephites, portraying them as believing Israelites who had a belief in Christ many hundreds of years before Jesus's birth. According to the book, the Nephites are one of four groups (the others being the Lamanites, Jaredites, and Mulekites) who settled in the ancient Americas. The Nephites are described as a group of people that descended from or were associated with Nephi, the son of the prophet Lehi, who left Jerusalem at the urging of God c. 600 BC and traveled with his family to the Western Hemisphere, arriving in the Americas c. 589 BC. After the translation was complete, Smith said he returned the golden plates to the Angel Moroni.

A contemporary Mormon view is that these Israelite civilizations rose and fell in Mesoamerica. Civilizations of their magnitude and duration would be expected to leave extensive archaeological records. Several Mesoamerican civilizations did exist in the time period covered by the Book of Mormon, including the Olmec, Zapotec and Maya. The Olmec and Zapotec civilizations developed a writing system that may have served as the model for the later Mayan writing system, which became highly developed. The Maya developed a complex calendar and were advanced in astronomy and mathematics.

The Book of Mormon mentions several animals, plants, and technologies for which there is no evidence in Book of Mormon time frames in pre-Columbian America. These include asses, cattle, horses, oxen, sheep, swine, goats, elephants, wheat, barley,  silk, steel, brass, breast plates, chains,  plows, swords, scimitars, and chariots. The Smithsonian Institution stated in 1997 that "none of the principal food plants and domestic animals of the Old World (except the dog) were present in the New World before Columbus."

Adherents of the Latter Day Saint movement give varied responses to these criticisms. Some point to what they claim is evidence for the presence of these items and locations. Others invoke the limited geography model, regarding the events of the Book of Mormon as taking place in such a geographically limited area that no evidence should be expected. Some counter that the words used in the Book of Mormon refer not to the animals, plants and technologies that they do presently but to other similar items that did exist at the time. These views are not directly supported by the LDS Church, but they do support archaeological efforts to further understand these situations, including research being performed by Brigham Young University (BYU) professors.

Brigham Young and the pioneer church (1844–1951)

Adam–God doctrine 

The Ostlings criticize Brigham Young's teachings that God and Adam are the same being. One apostle, Franklin D. Richards, also accepted the doctrine as taught by Young, stating in a conference held in June 1854 that "the Prophet and Apostle Brigham has declared it, and that it is the word of the Lord". But, when the concept was first introduced, several LDS leaders disagreed with the doctrine, including apostle Orson Pratt, who expressed that disagreement publicly. The church never formally adopted the doctrine, and has since officially repudiated it.

Blood atonement 

Brigham Young introduced a doctrine known as "blood atonement", regarding the unpardonable sin, or sin for which Jesus Christ's atonement does not apply. He taught that a person could atone for such sins only by giving up his or her life. Various church leaders in the 19th century taught likewise, but more recently church leaders have taught that the atonement of Jesus Christ is all-encompassing and that there is no sin so severe that it cannot be forgiven (with the exception of the "unpardonable sin" of denying the Holy Ghost).

Racism

Restrictions on black members of African descent 
From 1852 to 1978 church policy excluded men of black African descent from ordination to the priesthood. During the same period black men and women were not allowed to participate in temple endowment or sealing ordinances. Richard and Joan Ostling point to the restrictions as evidence that past LDS Church policies were racist in nature. Before the change in policy, most other adult males in the LDS Church were given the priesthood. Jerald and Sandra Tanner cite quotes from church leaders such as Brigham Young, who said, "You must not think, from what I say, that I am opposed to slavery. No! The negro is damned, and is to serve his master till God chooses to remove the curse of Ham". The Tanners also illustrate church racism by quoting sections of the Book of Mormon which describe dark skin as a sign of a curse and a mark from God to distinguish a more righteous group of people from a less righteous group, and by citing passages describing white skin as "delightsome" while dark skin is portrayed as unenticing. These references in the Book of Mormon refer to those presumed to be the ancestors of Native Americans, not people of African descent. Joseph Fielding Smith, later president of the church, wrote in a 1963 letter that people with dark skin were less faithful in the pre-mortal life, and as such, did not warrant the blessings of the priesthood. The Tanners also cite other church leaders, historical and modern, who have spoken in favor of segregation and restrictions on admission to the priesthood for men of African descent.

Policy reversal 
On 8 June 1978, church president Spencer W. Kimball, rescinded the restriction on priesthood ordination and extended temple worship to all worthy Latter-day Saint men and women. Also in 1978, Apostle Bruce R. McConkie told members to "[f]orget everything that I have said, or what President Brigham Young or President George Q. Cannon or whomsoever has said [about Blacks and the priesthood] .... We spoke with a limited understanding." Both the original policy and the reversal are criticized. The Tanners state that the church's 1978 policy change of allowing all worthy male members, including people of black African descent, to hold the priesthood was not divinely inspired as the church said, but simply a matter of convenience. Richard and Joan Ostling point out that this reversal of policy occurred as the LDS Church began to expand outside the United States into countries such as Brazil that have large, ethnically mixed populations, and as the church prepared to open a new temple in São Paulo, Brazil. The restriction on the priesthood was never formally established as church doctrine. The reasons for it have never been made clear, although some opinions were expressed over the years by various church leaders. A few black elders were ordained to the priesthood under Joseph Smith, who never expressed any opposition to having the priesthood available to all worthy men. The priesthood restriction originated under Brigham Young.

Gregory Prince and William Robert Wright state that these leaders were a product of their time and locale. They say that many leaders, including Smith, David O. McKay, and initially Brigham Young, were not opposed to blacks receiving the priesthood. They further state that the policy was a practice supported by Christian scripture and was not a doctrine of the church. Despite several church leaders throughout the 1950s and 1960s supporting its reversal, the policy was kept in place through 1978 because the Quorum of the Twelve Apostles felt that a revelation to the president of the church was needed to change it.

Calls for apology and transparency 
Some black members and critics have called on the church to do more to apologize for the restrictions, while other black members have argued against that effort.  In 2004 Darron Smith, a critical black church member, contends in his book, Black and Mormon, that the church "refuses to acknowledge and undo its racist past, and until it does that, members continue to suffer psychological damage from it" and that "the church has not done enough to rectify its racist past". The large majority of black Mormons, however, say they are willing to look beyond the racist teachings and adhere to the church. Church president Gordon B. Hinckley gave sermons against racism. In 2005 he taught that no one who utters denigrating remarks can consider himself a true disciple of Christ, and noted the irony of racial claims to the Melchizedek priesthood.

In 2003 Richard Abanes contended that the church tries to hide past racial practices, citing the 1981 change in the Book of Mormon, which stated that the Lamanites had become "a white and a delightsome people" to "a pure and a delightsome people" (2 Nephi 30:6). In 1840, the "white and delightsome" of the original Book of Mormon text was changed by Joseph Smith to "pure and delightsome" in the third edition; it reverted to "white and delightsome" after Smith's death in subsequent editions, as editions were based on one published in England. In 1981, the First Presidency approved a change that adopted the 1840 version by Smith, as saying that converts would become "pure and delightsome".

Recent scrutiny and church response 

Criticisms for the past policies on race discrimination were renewed during the 2012 presidential campaign of Mitt Romney and in 2018 surrounding the 40th anniversary of the lifting of race restrictions. The church published the following statement in December 2013:Today, the Church disavows the theories advanced in the past that black skin is a sign of divine disfavor or curse, or that it reflects unrighteous actions in a premortal life; that mixed-race marriages are a sin; or that blacks or people of any other race or ethnicity are inferior in any way to anyone else. Church leaders today unequivocally condemn all racism, past and present, in any form.In an October 2020 General Conference address following the George Floyd protests, church president Russell M. Nelson publicly condemned racism and called upon all church members to abandon attitudes and actions of prejudice.

Polygamy officially discontinued in 1890 

The Tanners argue that the church's 1890 reversal of its policy on polygamy was done for political reasons, citing the fact that the change was made during the church's lengthy conflict with the federal government over property seizures and statehood. The Ostlings say that, soon after the church received the revelation that polygamy was prohibited, Utah again applied for statehood. This time the federal government did not object to starting the statehood process. Six years later, the process was completed and Utah was admitted as a state in 1896. The Ostlings note that soon after the church suspended the practice of polygamy, the federal government reduced its legal efforts to seize church property.  Despite this, Mormon leaders after 1890 continued to sanction and participate in plural marriages in secret, in smaller numbers, both in the U.S. and in Mexico, for the next several decades.

Mormons Ron Wood and Linda Thatcher do not dispute that the change was a result of federal intervention and say that the church had no choice in the matter. The 1887 Edmunds–Tucker Act was crippling the church and "something dramatic had to be done to reverse [the] trend." After the church appealed its case to the U.S. Supreme Court and lost, church president Wilford Woodruff issued the 1890 Manifesto. Woodruff noted in his journal that he was "acting for the temporal salvation of the Church".

Polygamy after 1890 

Richard Abanes, Richard and Joan Ostling, and D. Michael Quinn note that after the 1890 Manifesto, church leaders authorized more than 200 polygamous marriages and lied about the continuing practice.

Joseph F. Smith acknowledged reports that church leaders did not fully adhere to the 1890 prohibition. After the Second Manifesto in 1904, anyone entering into a new plural marriage was excommunicated.

Recent leaders and the world-wide church (1951–present)

God was once a man 

Critics such as Richard Abanes and the Institute for Religious Research criticize the church for changing the principle asserting that God was once a man. They cite changes to the LDS Church publication Gospel Principles between the 1978 and 1997 editions, where "We can become Gods like our Heavenly Father" was changed to "We can become like our Heavenly Father", and "our Heavenly Father became a God" was changed to "our Heavenly Father became God". But, official LDS Church publications still affirm the doctrine of eternal progression, and the official church manual, Teachings of Presidents of the Church: Lorenzo Snow (2012), affirms that "As man is, God once was; as God now is, man may be." The 2009 edition of Gospel Principles quotes Joseph Smith as stating, "It is the first principle of the Gospel to know for a certainty the Character of God. … He was once a man like us; … God himself, the Father of us all, dwelt on an earth, the same as Jesus Christ himself did".

Responses to abuse allegations 

Reacting to accusations of abuse by teachers, Boy Scouts leaders, clergy, etc., social welfare activists have campaigned for more robust of measures toward greater prevention of abuse of individuals served by counselors and other professionals, advocating greater transparency and quicker referral of allegations to criminal investigators.

The Survivors Network of those Abused by Priests and others have criticized one-on-one ("worthiness") interviews between LDS pastoral leaders and (especially) adolescent congregants, believing them "an invitation" for abuse. An editorial in the sectarian (LDS Church) Deseret News responded:The LDS Church has a zero tolerance policy concerning sexual misconduct. It also gives specific instruction on conducting one-on-one interviews with youths, including encouraging them to have parents or other trustworthy adults sit directly outside the room. Church leaders are to avoid any situation that could be misinterpreted.

In 2018 over 800 protesters gathered and marched to the LDS Church headquarters to deliver a petition with over 55,000 signatures asking for an end to semiannual, closed-door, one-on-one interviews between adult male local church leaders and children and teens during which many members have been asked about their sexual behaviors and thoughts in ways they felt were harmful.

Finances 

The church has often been secretive about its finances, especially in the United States. The church has not disclosed its assets in the U.S. since 1959. This has drawn criticism from the Ostlings and the Tanners, who consider its financial practices to be overly secretive.

The church does disclose financials in the United Kingdom and Canada, where it is required to by law. In addition, the church employs an independent audit department that provides its certification at each annual general conference that church contributions are collected and spent in accordance with church policy. Moreover, the church engages a public accounting firm (currently Deloitte & Touche in the United States; PricewaterhouseCoopers in the United Kingdom) to perform annual audits of its not-for-profit, for-profit, and educational entities. Lay leaders at the local level are not paid.

The Tanners and the Ostlings accuse the church of being overly greedy and materialistic, citing the large amount of wealth accumulated by the church, and citing the strong emphasis on tithing, and suggest that the church is more like a business than a spiritual endeavor.

In December 2019, a whistleblower alleged the church holds over $100 billion in investment funds, which are managed by an affiliate, Ensign Peak Advisors; that it failed to use the funds for charitable purposes and instead used them in for-profit ventures; and that it misled contributors and the public about the usage and extent of those funds. According to the whistleblower, applicable law requires the funds be used for religious, educational or other charitable purposes for the fund to maintain its tax-exempt status. Other commentators have argued that such expenditures may not be legally required as claimed. In response to the allegations, the church's First Presidency stated that "the Church complies with all applicable law governing our donations, investments, taxes, and reserves," and that "a portion" of funds received by the church are "methodically safeguarded through wise financial management and the building of a prudent reserve for the future."

Criticism of response to internal dissent 

The Ostlings say that the LDS Church retaliates against members that publish information that undermines church policies, citing excommunications of scientist Simon Southerton and biographer Fawn M. Brodie. They further state that the church suppresses intellectual freedom, citing the 1993 excommunication of the "September Six", including gay LDS historian D. Michael Quinn, and author Lavina Fielding Anderson. The Ostlings write that Anderson was the first to reveal the LDS Church keeps files on Mormon scholars, documenting questionable activities, and the Ostlings state that "No other sizable religion in America monitors its followers in this way".

The American Association of University Professors, since 1998, has put LDS Church-owned Brigham Young University along with twenty-six other universities on its censured list of universities that do not allow tenured professors sufficient freedom in teaching and research.

Richard Abanes lists the following as church members excommunicated or censured for views unacceptable to the church hierarchy:
 Journalist Deborah Laake, for her book Secret Ceremonies: A Mormon Woman's Intimate Diary of Marriage and Beyond
 BYU English teacher Cecilia Konchar-Farr, for her views on abortion laws
 Writer Janice Merrill Allred
 English Professor Gail Houston
 Anthropologist David Knowlton

Church monitors members' critical publications 
Richard Abanes and the Ostlings criticize the LDS Church for maintaining a group called the Strengthening Church Members Committee, led by two church apostles. According to the Ostlings, the purpose of this committee is to collect and file "letters to the editor, other writings, quotes in the media, and public activities" of church members that may be publishing views contrary to those of the church leadership. The committee has also recruited students to spy on professors at Brigham Young University who are suspected of violating the church's dictates.

The Tanners state that throughout the 20th century the church denied scholars access to many key church documents, and in 1979 said that it had refused to publish Joseph Smith's diary. Apologists point out that The Joseph Smith Papers project provides access to Smith's journals.

Alleged distortion of its own history 

An analysis of B. H. Roberts's work History of the Church, when compared to the original manuscripts from which it is drawn, "more than 62,000 words" can be identified that were either added or deleted. Based on this analysis, Jerald and Sandra Tanner contend that the church distorts its history in order to portray itself in a more favorable light. Specifically, they allege that there was a systematic removal of events that portray Joseph Smith in a negative light.

D. Michael Quinn responded to these charges by pointing out that methods by Roberts used in creating History of the Church—while flawed by today's standards—were not uncommon practices in the nineteenth century, even by reputable historians.

The Tanners cite the selective use of Brigham Young's statements, presented in a manner to give the illusion that he was in favor of blacks receiving the priesthood. The Tanners also state that the church attempted to discredit evidence that Joseph Smith was arrested, tried, and found guilty by a justice of the peace in Bainbridge, New York, in 1826. The Tanners have also highlighted changes such as the title page of the 1830 edition of the Book of Mormon that described Smith as "Author and Proprietor" of the book, which was revised in subsequent editions to be "Translator", and the description of Oliver Cowdery's skill at using the divining rod found in the 1829 edition of the Book of Commandments, which does not appear in the corresponding section of the 1835 edition of the Doctrine and Covenants.

FARMS responds to the "author and proprietor" charge by arguing this title conformed to the governing copyright laws in 1830.

The Ostlings consider other omissions to be distortion, noting that the widely distributed church manual Teachings of Presidents of the Church: Brigham Young omits any mention of Young's polygamy, and that the book's chronological summary of Young's life includes the date of his first marriage, the date of the first wife's death, and the date of the second legal marriage, but omits mention of Young's dozens of other marriages.

In 1842, Willard Richards compiled a number of records in order to produce a history of the church. Among the records examined were the various accounts related to Zelph. In the process of combining the accounts, Richards crossed out Woodruff's references to "hill Cumorah," and Heber C. Kimball's reference to the "last great struggle with the Lamanites"

Mormon historian D. Michael Quinn has accused LDS Church leaders of urging historians to hide "controversies and difficulties of the Mormon past". Mormon scholar Allen Robers says church leaders "attempt to control depictions of the Mormon past". Non-Mormon professor John Hallwas of Western Illinois University says of LDS historians: "[they] do not mention Mormon intimidation, deception, repression, theft, and violence, or any other matters that might call into question the sacred nature of the Mormon experience."

Columbia University professor Richard Bushman, a member of The Joseph Smith Papers advisory board, responds to critics that those on the project "work on the assumption that the closer you get to Joseph Smith in the sources, the stronger he will appear, rather than the reverse, as is so often assumed by critics."

In 1969, the Western History Association published Jewish historian Moses Rischin's observation of a new trend among Mormon historians to report objectively. Quinn cites this as the origin of the term "New Mormon history", while citing previous efforts towards objectivity such as Juanita Brooks's 1950 publication of The Mountain Meadows Massacre by Stanford University Press.

Views on sexuality 

Deborah Laake and Colleen McDannell say that the church takes a repressive stance towards sexuality and that this may be psychologically unhealthy.

Affirmation, a Mormon LGBT organization, and Ed Decker, a critic of the LDS Church, both state that the repressive attitude of the church may—in extreme cases—lead to suicide, as in the case of 16-year-old Kip Eliason, who committed suicide because of the stresses that resulted when his church bishop told him that masturbation was sinful.

In January 1982, the church's First Presidency issued a letter to local leaders stating that they had "interpreted oral sex as constituting an unnatural, impure, or unholy practice." The letter was not distributed to the general membership. This letter also instructed local leaders not to inquire into the specifics of married members' sex lives. However, this portion of the letter was often ignored, and in response to letters of protest from members, another letter was issued to local leaders in October reiterating the prohibition on inquiring into specific sexual practices.

Views on homosexuality 

Scott Thumma and Affirmation.org contend that the LDS Church is homophobic. Affirmation.org cites a faithful, celibate, gay Latter-day Saint who shortly before his suicide wrote: "Straight members have absolutely no idea what it is like to grow up gay in this church. It is a life of constant torment, self-hatred and internalized homophobia."

"God Loveth His Children", a pamphlet produced by the LDS Church, acknowledges that many gays "have felt rejected because members of the Church did not always show love." It criticizes those members, and challenges gays to show love and kindness so the members can "change their attitudes and follow Christ more fully".

Gay historian D. Michael Quinn has hypothesized that early church leaders had a more tolerant view of homosexuality. He writes that several early church leaders and prominent members, including Louie B. Felt, May Anderson, Evan Stephens, and presiding patriarch Joseph Fielding Smith, may have either had homosexual tendencies or were involved in homosexual relationships. George Mitton and Rhett S. James do not dispute that some early members may have had homosexual tendencies, but they call Quinn's assertion of tolerance a distortion of church history that has  little support from other historians. They state the current leadership of the church "is entirely consistent with the teachings of past leaders and with the scriptures."

In the early 1970s, Ford McBride did research in electroshock therapy while a student at Brigham Young University (BYU); he performed it on volunteer homosexual students to help cure them of ego-dystonic sexual orientation. This was a standard type of aversion therapy used to treat homosexuality, which was considered a mental illness at the time.

As church president, Gordon B. Hinckley encouraged church members to reach out to homosexuals with love and understanding.

Affirmation.org has particularly criticized sexual repression of homosexuals, both inside and outside of the church.

A letter dated June 20, 2008, sent to Mormon bishops and signed by the First Presidency, called on Mormons to donate "means and time" to a California ballot measure designed to defeat the state's May ruling allowing same-sex marriage. Richard and Joan Ostling point out that the LDS Church actively campaigns against same-sex marriage statutes, including donating $500,000 in 1998 towards a campaign to defeat such a referendum in Alaska. The church's support (80 to 90 percent of the early volunteers who walked door-to-door in election precincts and as much as half of the nearly $40 million raised) of California's Proposition 8 in 2008 sparked heated debate and protesting by gay-rights organizations. The church's political involvement and stance on homosexuality has been denounced by antagonistic former LDS member and homosexual Reed Cowan in the 2010 documentary film 8: The Mormon Proposition (although Cowan's reputation as a journalist has been damaged by recent accusations of extortion).

Gender bias and sexism 

Richard and Joan Ostling argue that the LDS Church treats women as inferior to men. The Cult Awareness and Information Centre also point to comments such as those made by church leader Bruce R. McConkie, who wrote in 1966 that a "woman's primary place is in the home, where she is to rear children and abide by the righteous counsel of her husband". The First Presidency and the Quorum of the Twelve espouse a complementarian view of gender roles.

Claudia Lauper Bushman notes that, in the 1970s and 1980s, "just as American women pressed for greater influence", the LDS Church decreased the visibility and  responsibilities of women in various areas including welfare, leadership, training, publishing, and policy setting. Despite this, Bushman asserts, "most LDS women tend to be good-natured and pragmatic: they work on the things that they can change and forget the rest."

Jerald and Sandra Tanner point to comments by certain church leaders as evidence that women are subject to different rules regarding entry into heaven. They state that 19th-century leader Erastus Snow preached: "No woman will get into the celestial kingdom, except her husband receives her, if she is worthy to have a husband; and if not, somebody will receive her as a servant". In Mormon doctrine, celestial marriage is a prerequisite for exaltation for members of either gender.

Those who adopt humanist or feminist perspectives may view certain alleged or former LDS Church doctrines (including the spiritual status of blacks, polygamy, and the role of women in society) as racist or sexist.

Criticism regarding temples

Critics find fault with the church's temple policies and ceremonies, which include an endowment ceremony, weddings, and proxy baptism for the dead.

Temple admission restricted

Richard and Joan Ostling, and Hugh F. Pyle state that the LDS Church's policy on temple admission is unreasonable, noting that even relatives cannot attend a temple marriage unless they are members of the church in good standing. The Ostlings, the Institute for Religious Research, and Jerald and Sandra Tanner say that the admission rules are unreasonable because admission to the temple requires that a church member must first declare that they pay their full tithe before they can enter a temple. The Mormonism Research Ministry calls this "coerced tithing" because church members that do not pay the full tithe cannot enter the temple, and thus cannot receive the ordinances required to receive the highest order of exaltation in the next life.

Baptism for the dead

The church teaches that a living person, acting as proxy, can be baptized by immersion on behalf of a deceased person, citing 1 Corinthians 15:29; Malachi 4:5–6; John 5:25; and 1 Peter 4:6 for doctrinal support. These baptisms for the dead are performed in temples.

Floyd C. McElveen and the Institute for Religious Research state that verses to support baptism for the dead are not justified by contextual exegesis of the Bible. In 2008, the Vatican issued a statement calling the practice "erroneous" and directing its dioceses to keep parish records from the Genealogical Society of Utah which is affiliated with the LDS Church.

Holocaust survivors and other Jewish groups criticized the LDS Church in 1995, after discovering that the church had baptized more than 300,000 Jewish Holocaust victims. After that criticism, church leaders put a policy in place to stop the practice, with an exception for baptisms specifically requested or approved by victims' relatives. Jewish organizations again criticized the church in 2002, 2004, and 2008 stating that the church failed to honor the 1995 agreement. However, Jewish and Mormon leaders subsequently acknowledged in a joint statement in 2010 that "concerns between members of both groups...have been eliminated."

Endowment ceremony

Jerald and Sandra Tanner allege that Joseph Smith copied parts of the Mormon temple endowment ceremony from Masonic rituals (such as secret handshakes, clothing, and passwords), and that this undermines the church's statement that the rituals were divinely inspired. The Tanners also point to the fact that Joseph Smith was himself a Freemason prior to introducing the endowment rituals into Mormonism.

The Tanners criticize the church's revision of the temple endowment ceremony over the years, saying that revisions were made to obscure provocative practices of the early church.

FairMormon, a Mormon apologetic organization, acknowledges changes to the endowment ceremony and points out that (according to Joseph Fielding Smith) Joseph Smith told Brigham Young the ceremony was "not arranged perfectly", and challenged him to organize and systemize it, which Young continued to do throughout his presidency.

Mormon apologetics organizations

FARMS scholarship questioned

Critics say the LDS Church is academically dishonest, because it supported biased research conducted by the previously church-owned Foundation for Ancient Research and Mormon Studies (FARMS). FARMS was an independent organization but in 1997 became a research institute within church-owned Brigham Young University that publishes Mormon scholarship. It was dissolved in 2006. Critic Matthew Paulsen, of the Christian countercult group Christian Apologetics and Research Ministry, faulted FARMS for limiting peer review to members of the LDS Church. He stated that FARMS's primary goal is to defend the Mormon faith rather than to promote truthful scholarship. Molecular biologist Simon Southerton, a former LDS Church bishop and author of Losing a Lost Tribe: Native Americans, DNA, and the Mormon Church said, "I was amazed at the lengths that FARMS went to in order to prop up faith in the Book of Mormon. I felt that the only way I could be satisfied with FARMS explanations was to stop thinking .... The explanations of the FARMS researchers stretched the bounds of credibility to breaking point on almost every critical issue".

FARMS supported what it considered to be "faithful scholarship", which includes academic study and research in support of Christianity and Mormonism, and in particular, where possible, the official position of the LDS Church.

Allegations of covering up sex abuse
On December 28, 2020, seven lawsuits were filed against the LDS Church for allegedly covering up decades of sexual abuse among its Boy Scouts of America (BSA) troops in Arizona. On September 15, 2021, it was agreed that the BSA, which the church ended affiliation with in 2020, would receive an estimated $250 million in settlements from the church. The church had been the BSA's largest single sponsor.

See also

 Anti-cult movement
 Anti-Mormonism
 Criticism of Mormon sacred texts
 Fundamentalist Church of Jesus Christ of Latter-Day Saints: Criticism
 Latter Day Saints in popular culture
 MormonWikiLeaks
 South Park episode "All About Mormons"
 Reformed Egyptian
 Stay LDS / Mormon
 The God Makers

Footnotes

References

 

 

. Online copy

. Online copy at olivercowdery.com

Further reading

External links

Critical
 Utah Lighthouse Ministry – Maintained by Sandra Tanner
 MormonThink

Apologetic
 BYU operated Foundation for Ancient Research and Mormon Studies (FARMS)
 Church-unaffiliated Foundation for Apologetic Information & Research (FAIR)

 
Criticism